KXGL (100.9 FM) is a commercial radio station located in Amarillo, Texas. KXGL airs a classic hits music format branded as "The Eagle". Under ownership of Alpha Media, studios are located in southwest Amarillo (in the same building as sister stations KGNC-AM-FM), and its transmitter is north of the city in unincorporated Potter County.

History
Prior to its existence as a classic hits station, KXGL was a Spanish language format station called, "La Picosita" with the call sign KPQZ. The station was purchased by Feuer/McCord Communications Inc. for US$3 million in 2002. Feuer/McCord Communications became JMJ Broadcasting in 2005.KXGL was sold to Alpha Media in September 2015.

On a Sunday night in October 2002, Amarillo got a brand new radio station with a unique sound beginning its broadcast with "20,000 Songs In A Row".

By mandate, there would be fewer commercials. There would be several times a day where there would be no commercials. "Eagle Commercial Free Flights" would span 100 minutes with Classic Hits.

The on-air personalities were announced over time, with the morning show members added first. Internal research of current Amarillo morning programs, with some out of town names included, indicated potential listeners had a preference.

Jamey Karr & Morgan Tanner, both inductees of the Texas Panhandle Broadcasters Hall Of Fame, were lured from their post at crosstown KPUR-FM. In December 2002, Karr was named Operations Manager of KXGL, and Tanner was chosen for the Production Manager position.  
On January 2, 2003, Jamey & Morgan became the first personalities heard on The Eagle and became the # 1 morning show in August 2003, a ranking they still hold.

Other staffers since 2002 include Mike Anthony, Christi Stone, Mike Shannon, Amy Hart, Kari Foxx, Aaron Gamble, Mike Hill. Lisa Chrane, and Eric Stevens..

Johnny Black, a ten-year Amarillo radio veteran, became The Eagle's afternoon host in December 2014. Lani Clark, moved from KGNC-FM, to middays the Eagle in January 2018.

John Van Camp, a veteran of California radio, joined The Eagle for nights in April 2017
100.9 The Eagle celebrated its 10th anniversary in October 2012, with ZZ Top performing at the "Birthday Bash!".

References

External links
Official Website

XGL
Classic hits radio stations in the United States
Radio stations established in 1997
Alpha Media radio stations